Horsfieldia longiflora is a threatened species of plant in the family Myristicaceae. It is endemic to Vietnam. The species appears to be restricted to submontane evergreen forest.

References

longiflora
Endemic flora of Vietnam
Trees of Vietnam
Vulnerable plants
Taxonomy articles created by Polbot